The 1956 Harvard Crimson football team represented Harvard University as a member of the Ivy League. The Crimson were led by seventh-year head coach Lloyd Jordan and played their home games at Harvard Stadium in the Allston neighborhood of Boston, Massachusetts.

Schedule

References

Harvard
Harvard Crimson football seasons
Harvard Crimson football
1950s in Boston